←2012 - 2013 - 2014→

This is a list of Japanese television dramas shown within Japan during the year of 2013.

Winter

Spring

Summer

Autumn

References

2013 Japanese television dramas
Dramas